Ascott Earl Castle was a castle in the village of Ascott Earl, Oxfordshire, England.

Details
Ascott Earl Castle was built in the village of Ascott Earl, to a motte-and-bailey design. The castle is very close to the fortification of Ascot d'Oilly Castle, built on an adjacent estate at the other end of the village. Ascott Earl Castle lies on former Iron Age fortifications; its motte is 56m wide and 3.5m high; the surrounding bailey is in the shape of a crescent, approximately 70m by 30m wide.

Today the castle is a scheduled monument.

Bibliography
Creighton, Oliver Hamilton. (2005) Castles and Landscapes: Power, Community and Fortification in Medieval England. London: Equinox. .

See also
Castles in Great Britain and Ireland
List of castles in England

References

Castles in Oxfordshire